The 1968 NBA All-Star Game was an exhibition basketball game which was played at Madison Square Garden in New York City, January 23, 1968.

Coaches: East: Alex Hannum, West: Bill Sharman.
Officials: Mendy Rudolph and Don Murphy
MVP: Hal Greer
Attendance: 18,422

Teams

Western Conference

Eastern Conference

Score by periods

References 

National Basketball Association All-Star Game
All-Star
NBA All-Star Game
NBA All-Star Game
Sports in Manhattan
Basketball competitions in New York City
1960s in Manhattan